Tour Europlaza (previously known as tour Septentrion) is an office skyscraper located in La Défense business district situated west of Paris, [rance.

Built in 1972, the  tower belongs to the second generation of skyscrapers in La Défense. The tower distinguishes itself from the other towers of that period, thanks to a less boxy design and an original cladding. The tower was originally named Septentrion because of its northern location in the business district (Septentrion means North in French).

From 2019 on, the tower hosts the European Banking Authority which relocated from London following the Brexit.

See also 
 List of tallest structures in Paris

References

External links 
 Tour Europlaza (Emporis)

Europlaza
Europlaza
Office buildings completed in 1972
Buildings and structures completed in 1972